JLM may refer to:

 Jerusalem, the largest city in Israel
 Made in JLM, an Israeli non-profit organisation based in Jerusalem
 Jean-Luc Mélenchon, member of the National Assembly of France, president of the France insoumise parliamentary group
 Jewish Labour Movement, a British socialist society
 Chinese University of Hong Kong, the suffix code commonly used to represent the "School of Journalism and Communication, CUHK"
 John Lennon Museum, a defunct museum in Saitama, Japan
 Atlantic Express (Gambia airline) (ICAO airline code: JLM)
 A Jailhouse Lawyer's Manual 
 Johnny Lee Middleton, bass guitar player from Savatage and Trans-Siberian Orchestra